

Incumbents
President: Roch Marc Christian Kaboré
Prime Minister: Christophe Joseph Marie Dabiré

Events
Ongoing: COVID-19 pandemic and terrorism in Burkina Faso

January
January 7 – Prime Minister Christophe Joseph Marie Dabiré is reappointed.

February
February 10 – President Kaboré travels to Brussels, Belgium, on the first stop of a European tour.
February 13 – Ramesh Rajasingham, acting United Nations assistant secretary-general for humanitarian affairs, tells the Associated Press that Burkina Faso is on the brink of a humanitarian crisis as 3.5 million people need assistance.
February 25 – Burkina Faso is one of four countries added to the Financial Action Task Force (FATF) list of places that are only partially in compliance with international efforts against financing terrorism and money laundering.

March

April
April 26 - Spanish journalists David Beriáin and Roberto Fraile, along with Irish activist Rory Young, were killed - reportedly by members of jihadist group Jama'at Nasr al-Islam wal Muslimin - while accompanying an anti-poaching patrol near Natiaboni.

May
May 3 - Over 100 Islamist militants attacked the village of Kodyel, Foutouri, Komondjari Province, Est Region, killing 30 people.

June
 June 4-5: More than 100 civilians were killed in Solhan and Tadaryat, Yagha Province.

November
 21 November - A healthcare centre supported by Médecins Sans Frontières (MSF) in Foube, Barsalogho department, in the Centre-North region of Burkina Faso, was burnt down. A member of the MSF team was injured during an attack by unidentified armed men, probably targeting the Foube police post, a few hundred metres away. The violence continues to increase daily in Burkina Faso.

December
 23 December - AFP reports that suspected militants ambushed and killed 41 members of a column of civilian fighters from the Homeland Defence Volunteers (VDP), a group the government funds and trains to contain Islamist insurgents. The government of Burkina Faso has declared a two-day mourning period.

Culture
January 30 – Panafrican Film and Television Festival of Ouagadougou (FESPACO) is postponed indefinitely.

Deaths

See also

COVID-19 pandemic in Africa
Boko Haram
Economic Community of West African States
Community of Sahel–Saharan States
Politics of Burkina Faso
National Assembly of Burkina Faso
Organisation internationale de la Francophonie
Community of Sahel–Saharan States

References

 
2020s in Burkina Faso
Years of the 21st century in Burkina Faso
Burkina Faso